Yellowstone County is the most populous county in the U.S. state of Montana. As of the 2020 census, the population was 164,731.  Its county seat is Billings. Yellowstone County is named for the Yellowstone River which roughly bisects the county, flowing southwest to northeast. The river in turn was named after the yellow Sandstone cliffs in what is now Yellowstone County.

Yellowstone County is included in the Billings, Montana Metropolitan Statistical Area.

Geography

Major highways

Adjacent counties

 Musselshell County – north
 Rosebud County – northeast
 Treasure County – east
 Big Horn County – southeast
 Carbon County – southwest
 Stillwater County – west
 Golden Valley County – northwest

National protected areas
 Nez Perce National Historical Park (part)
 Pompeys Pillar National Monument

Demographics

2000 census
As of the 2000 United States census, there were 129,352 people, 52,084 households, and 34,219 families in the county. The population density was 49 people per square mile (19/km2). There were 54,563 housing units at an average density of 21 per square mile (8/km2). The racial makeup of the county was 92.78% White, 0.45% Black or African American, 3.05% Native American, 0.54% Asian, 0.04% Pacific Islander, 1.26% from other races, and 1.87% from two or more races. 3.70% of the population were Hispanic or Latino of any race. 31.1% were of German, 10.4% Norwegian, 9.7% Irish, 9.3% English and 5.4% American ancestry.

There were 52,084 households, out of which 31.60% had children under the age of 18 living with them, 51.80% were married couples living together, 10.10% had a female householder with no husband present, and 34.30% were non-families. 27.90% of all households were made up of individuals, and 10.10% had someone living alone who was 65 years of age or older. The average household size was 2.43 and the average family size was 2.98.

The county population contained 25.50% under the age of 18, 9.30% from 18 to 24, 28.70% from 25 to 44, 23.20% from 45 to 64, and 13.30% who were 65 years of age or older. The median age was 37 years. For every 100 females, there were 95.20 males. For every 100 females age 18 and over, there were 91.60 males.

The median income for a household in the county was $36,727, and the median income for a family was $45,277. Males had a median income of $33,475 versus $21,566 for females. The per capita income for the county was $19,303. About 8.50% of families and 11.10% of the population were below the poverty line, including 14.50% of those under age 18 and 7.40% of those age 65 or over.

2010 census
As of the 2010 United States census, there were 147,972 people, 60,672 households, and 38,367 families residing in the county. The racial makeup of the county was 90.7% white, 4.0% American Indian, 0.6% black or African American, 0.6% Asian, 0.1% Pacific islander, 1.2% from other races, and 2.8% from two or more races. Those of Hispanic or Latino origin made up 4.7% of the population. In terms of ancestry, 32.4% were German, 14.0% were Irish, 11.3% were English, 10.0% were American, and 9.9% were Norwegian.

Of the 60,672 households, 30.5% had children under the age of 18 living with them, 48.0% were married couples living together, 10.5% had a female householder with no husband present, 36.8% were non-families, and 29.7% of all households were made up of individuals. The average household size was 2.38 and the average family size was 2.94. The median age was 38.3 years.

The median income for a household in the county was $48,641 and the median income for a family was $62,380. Males had a median income of $42,899 versus $30,403 for females. The per capita income for the county was $26,152. About 7.9% of families and 11.2% of the population were below the poverty line, including 15.6% of those under age 18 and 7.7% of those age 65 or over.

Politics
Yellowstone County is rather conservative for an urban county. Its voters have been reliably Republican for the better part of a century. They have selected the Democratic Party candidate in only one national election since 1940 (as of 2020).

Communities

Cities
 Billings (county seat)
 Laurel

Town
 Broadview

Census-designated places

 Acton
 Ballantine
 Custer
 Huntley
 Lockwood
 Mountain View Colony
 Nibbe
 Pompeys Pillar
 Shepherd
 Worden

Other unincorporated communities

 Anita
 Billings Heights
 Bull Mountain
 Comanche
 Hesper
 Homewood Park
 Indian Arrow
 Newton
 Osborn
 Yegen

Ghost towns

 Coulson
 Mossmain
 Rimrock
 Waco

See also
 List of lakes in Yellowstone County, Montana
 List of mountains in Yellowstone County, Montana
 National Register of Historic Places listings in Yellowstone County, Montana

References

External links
County website

 
Billings metropolitan area
1883 establishments in Montana Territory
Populated places established in 1883